The Estevan riot, also known as the Black Tuesday Riot, was a confrontation between the Royal Canadian Mounted Police and striking coal miners from nearby Bienfait, Saskatchewan which took place in Estevan, Saskatchewan on September 29, 1931. The miners had been on strike since September 7, 1931 hoping to improve their wages and working conditions.

Background 
The region's mining work was seasonal; during the rest of the year, between April and August, miners would work in the fields to supplement wages before they returned to the mines. However, the droughts in the prairies and the overall economic situation in Canada made that impossible. That led to an increasing number of men looking for work in the mines, which let mining companies to choose their workers.

Furthermore, according to the Royal Commission that investigated the strike, Saskatchewan miners made half as much as their counterparts in Alberta and in British Columbia. Most of the miners and their families lived within company housing. Annie Barylik, the sixteen-year-old daughter of a miner at Bienfait Mine,s described the conditions: One bedroom, two beds in there, dining room, no beds in there, kitchen, one bed, and eleven in the family.... I think we need a bigger place than that. When it is raining the rain comes in the kitchen. There is only one ply of paper, cardboard paper nailed to about two-inch wood board.... It is all coming down and cracked... 
When the weather is frosty, when you wake up in the morning you cannot walk on the floor because it is all full of snow, right around the room.The miners were represented at the bargaining table by the local of the Mine Workers' Union of Canada (MWUC), which had been organized by the Communist Party of Canada's trade union umbrella, the Workers' Unity League.

Strike and riot 
The Mine Workers' Union of Canada local in Bienfait demanded a wage increase, an end to the company store monopoly, better living conditions, and improved workplace safety. The mining company refused to recognize the union as legitimate and refused their demands.

On 7 September 1931, Bienfait coal miner's voted to go on strike. Annie Buller, working with the Workers' Unity League, spoke in nearby Estevan in support of the striking workers.

On 29 September miners assembled in Estevan with their families to parade through the city in order to draw attention to their strike. As they walked from Beinfait to Estevan, they were met with lines of police officers. Upon entering the town square, the RCMP confronted the miners and attempted to block and break up the procession. Police violence broke out, and the RCMP opened fire on the strikers and killed three people and injured numerous others. Among those killed were miners Peter Markunas, Nick Nargan and Julian Gryshko.

The following morning, 90 RCMP officers raided the miner's homes. 13 strikers and union leader were arrested on charges of rioting. Annie Buller was sentenced to one year of hard labour, to be completed at the Battleford Jail, and a $500 fine. The RCMP involved with the killing of the miners were not charged.

On 6 October, the mining company conceded to key demands including a $4 minimum wage, an 8 hour working day, reduced rent, and an end to the company store monopoly.

Resolution 
After a meeting with Royal Commission Counsel, members of both parties signed the following agreement:We, the mine operators and employees in conference at the court-house Estevan, this sixth day of October, 1931, hereby agree that the mines be opened immediately and the men return to work on following conditions, viz.:(1) That this be considered a temporary arrangement pending the findings of the Wylie Royal Commission and the possible drafting of a working agreement between the operators and the men.(2) That committees of employees for each mine be a recognized organization in each mine.(3) That the provisions of the Mines Act be observed in relation to check-weighers.(4) That all water in the roadways and working face be removed by the company and that such places be kept as dry as possible.(5) That the terms of any schedule or agreement finally reached between the operators and the men be made retroactive to the date of re-commencement of work by them.(6) That there shall be no victimization or discrimination against men on account of the strike, particularly in reference to men on the payrolls as at September 7 last.(7) That contract men be employed on an eight-hour basis, face to face, and the company men work nine hours a day.(8) That because of working conditions in the various mines. the removal of slack and questions of overweight be left to negotiations between the operators and the committees of employees.

Legacy 
The event is still controversial in Estevan. The three striking miners killed have the inscription "murdered by RCMP" on their headstone, and locals still alternately erase and restore those words. The Saskatchewan Federation of Labour has created a plaque to memorialize the strikers.

Popular culture 
The riot was depicted in the controversial movie Prairie Giant: the Tommy Douglas Story in which Tommy Douglas is falsely portrayed to be present. Also, James Garfield Gardiner is portrayed as then being premier of Saskatchewan, but it was really James Thomas Milton Anderson.

The riot was depicted by James Keeleghan in the title track of the Small Rebellions album in 1990.

See also
Regina Riot
Great Depression in Canada
Prairie Giant: The Tommy Douglas Story
Workers' Unity League
Scandals surrounding the RCMP
James T.M. Anderson
Tommy Douglas
Annie Buller
History of Saskatchewan

References

External links
 Regina Leader Post Article on the Riot from the following day
 A Personal Editorial on the Riot including Photographs of Commemorative Plaques 
 1931 strike in Estevan Mercury 
 A Paper discussing the Strike and Subsequent Riot 
Review of Bienfait: The Saskatchewan Miners' Struggle of '31 (Stephen L. Endicott, Toronto: University of Toronto Press 2002) by Lorne Brown, Labour/Le Travail 52 (Fall 2003).
Estevan Coal Strike, Encyclopedia of Saskatchewan
Estevan Strike and Riot, 1931, Oral History Centre (University of Winnipeg)

1931 in Canada
1931 riots
Communism in Canada
Estevan
Great Depression in Canada
Protest marches
Labour disputes in Saskatchewan
Culture of Saskatchewan
Riots and civil disorder in Canada
1931 in Saskatchewan
1931 labor disputes and strikes
September 1931 events